Robin Talbot Johnstone (6 August 1901 – 20 February 1976) was a British rowing cox who competed in the 1920 Summer Olympics.

Johnstone was born at Ipswich, Suffolk and educated at Eton and  Cambridge University. He coxed Cambridge in The Boat Race in 1920. He also coxed the British boat that won the silver medal in the men's eight at the 1920 Summer Olympics at Antwerp.

Johnstone was later a flyer with Hanworth Club.

See also
List of Cambridge University Boat Race crews

References

External links
National Portrait Gallery

1901 births
1976 deaths
People educated at Eton College
English male rowers
British male rowers
Olympic rowers of Great Britain
Rowers at the 1920 Summer Olympics
Olympic silver medallists for Great Britain
Olympic medalists in rowing
Cambridge University Boat Club rowers
Medalists at the 1920 Summer Olympics
Coxswains (rowing)